Chrea is a town in Algeria, located in Blida Province, Ouled Yaïch District, in a mountainous area named Tell Atlas, near Blida. It had a population of 783 in 2008.

In its municipality is situated the Chréa National Park, one of the largest national parks of the country, and a ski resort.

Within the national park is one of the few relict populations of the endangered primate, the Barbary macaque, Macaca sylvanus; this species of primate originally had a much wider range in Northern Algeria and Morocco.

Geography

Climate 
Summers are warm and dry and winters are chilly and wetter, with snowfalls. This climate is described by the Köppen climate classification as Csb. This is one of the coldest places in Algeria.

References

External links
 Photos et history of Chréa

Resorts in Algeria
Populated places in Blida Province
Ski areas and resorts in Algeria
Blida Province